Goodman Gallery was founded in Johannesburg, South Africa by Linda Givon in 1966. With spaces in Johannesburg, Cape Town, and London, the gallery represents both established and emerging artists who have shaped the landscape of contemporary art in Southern Africa.

History 
Founded during apartheid, the gallery remained a "resolutely non-discriminatory space", protecting its artists and freedom of expression during the political tumult. It has progressively emerged as one of South Africa's top contemporary art gallery's.  Major South African artists such as David Koloane, David Goldblatt, Sue Williamson and Sam Nhlengethwa have all exhibited there.

Liza Essers purchased the gallery in 2008.

It focuses on "working with southern Africa's most significant artists, both established and emerging; those from the greater African continent; and international artists who engage with the African context." The names include  Ghada Amer, Candice Breitz, Kudzanai Chiurai, Mounir Fatmi, Alfredo Jaar, Liza Lou, Hank Willis Thomas, Adam Broomberg & Oliver Chanarin, Shirin Neshat, Kiluanji Kia Henda, Ishola Akpo and The Brother Moves On.

It has welcomed in a large number of internationally artists such as Alfredo Jaar, Shirin Neshat, and Yinka Shonibare CBE and others with a less social focus like Carrie Mae Weems, Hank Willis Thomas, and El Anatsui.

In 2016, Goodman was named one of 500 best galleries worldwide by Modern Painters. It also celebrated its 50th anniversary the same year with the two-part curatorial mission, In Context, co-curated by Liza Essers and artist Hank Willis Thomas that explored notions of African identity in both the United States and Africa.

You can find all the gallery locations  on the website

References

External links
 
Goodman Gallery page on Ocula

Culture of Johannesburg
Cape Town culture
Art galleries established in 1966
Art museums and galleries in South Africa
1966 establishments in South Africa